Raymond Eugene "Kevin" Sutton (born August 31, 1964) is an American college basketball coach, currently an assistant coach at the University of Rhode Island. Sutton previously served as the head boys basketball coach at Bishop McNamara, Montrose Christian, Montverde Academy and was the head coach for Team USA in the 2011 Nike/USA Basketball Hoop Summit.

Playing career 
In 1988, Sutton graduated from James Madison University where he played three years of varsity basketball and lettered each season.

High school coaching
Sutton coached at five nationally ranked high school programs—Flint Hill Prep (1988–1990), Harker Prep (1990–1992), St. John's Prospect Hall (1992–1998), Montrose Christian and Montverde Academy (2004–2011)—amassing a 489–102 record and winning two national championships. In 1998, he was the associate head coach on the USA Today Super 25 National Championship team and in 2007, he was the head coach of the Montverde Academy Hoops.Com National Championship team led by future NBA player Solomon Alabi.

While at Montverde Academy, Sutton's program was labeled a "basketball factory" by the Orlando Sentinel.  Sutton coached seven nationally ranked teams and compiled a 186-33 record, while turning out 55 Division I scholarship athletes and three All-America selections. During his final two seasons at Montverde, Sutton was assisted by former NBA player Andrew DeClercq, Matthew Wheeler and hip-hop artist Dorian.

College coaching
Sutton had a pair of two-year stints as an assistant coach at both James Madison University and Old Dominion University under Coach Jeff Capel.  In 2011, Sutton was hired at George Washington University.  In 2013, Sutton joined the staff at Georgetown University under coach John Thompson III. In 2016, he was hired by Kevin Stallings as an assistant coach at University of Pittsburgh.

Team USA 
Sutton has also been selected as a coach for USA Basketball on three occasions. He was an assistant coach at the Hoop Festival for the East team, had a two-year stint with the Junior Developmental Team (U16), which won a gold medal at the FIBA Americas Tournament in Argentina, and he was the head coach for the Nike/USA Basketball Hoop Summit, a game showcasing the top 10 international players against the top 10 American players. Led by Austin Rivers and Anthony Davis, Sutton's Team USA beat the World Team 92-80.

Personal life 
Sutton and his wife, Beth, have four children, Aaron, Kayleigh, Isaiah and Rileigh.

Notable players coached 
 Cory Alexander
 Solomon Alabi
 Bradley Beal
 James Bell
 Jason Capel
 Randolph Childress
 Patricio Garino
 Nate James
 George Lynch
 Luc Richard Mbah A Moute
 Haukur Palsson
 Ruslan Pateev
 L.D Williams
 Serge Zwikker

References

External links
 
 

1964 births
Living people
George Washington Colonials men's basketball coaches
Georgetown Hoyas men's basketball coaches
Old Dominion Monarchs men's basketball coaches
James Madison Dukes men's basketball players
Pittsburgh Panthers men's basketball coaches
High school basketball coaches in the United States
American men's basketball players